Chilips claduncus is a species of moth of the family Tortricidae. It is found in Chile.

References

Moths described in 1988
Euliini
Moths of South America
Taxa named by Józef Razowski
Endemic fauna of Chile